"Since I Told You It's Over" is a song by Welsh rock band Stereophonics from their fourth studio album, You Gotta Go There to Come Back (2003). Lead singer Kelly Jones wrote the song on 14 February 2003 and recorded it with Stereophonics at Abbey Road Studios. Released as a single on 10 November 2003, the song reached number 16 in the United Kingdom and number 50 in the Netherlands.

Track listings
UK CD1
 "Since I Told You It's Over" (single version) – 4:43
 "Nothing Precious at All" (live acoustic version) – 4:35
 "Madame Helga" (live acoustic version) – 3:29

UK CD2
 "Since I Told You It's Over" (demo) – 4:06
 "Jealousy" (demo) – 4:25
 "I Miss You Now" (demo) – 4:47

UK 7-inch single
 "Since I Told You It's Over" (single version) – 4:43
 "Maybe Tomorrow" (live acoustic version) – 4:15

UK DVD single
 "Since I Told You It's Over" (live video from Glasgow Barrowlands)
 "Maybe Tomorrow" (live acoustic version audio)

Credits and personnel
Credits are taken from the You Gotta Go There to Come Back album booklet.

Recording
 Written on 14 February 2003
 Recorded and mastered at Abbey Road (London, England)

Personnel

 Kelly Jones – writing, vocals, guitar, strings and brass arrangement, production
 Richard Jones – bass
 Tony Kirkham – piano
 Stuart Cable – drums
 Chris Cameron – strings and brass arrangement
 Chris Bolster – recording assistant
 Jim Lowe – mixing, engineering
 Steve McNichol – Pro Tools engineering
 Chris Blair – mastering

Charts

References

2003 singles
2003 songs
Songs written by Kelly Jones
Stereophonics songs
UK Independent Singles Chart number-one singles
V2 Records singles